Joanna Czarnecka (born May 4, 1982) is a Polish female professional basketball player.

External links
Profile at fibaeurope.com

1982 births
Living people
Sportspeople from Wrocław
Polish women's basketball players
Centers (basketball)